Merlin may refer to:

Arts and entertainment

Film and television
 Merlin (2008 TV series), also known as The Adventures of Merlin, a BBC One series  starring Colin Morgan and Bradley James
 Merlin (miniseries), a 1998 NBC miniseries starring Sam Neill
 Merlin: The Quest Begins , a 1998 TV film featuring Jason Connery
 Merlin: The Return, a British fantasy film released in the year 2000
 Mr. Merlin, an American sitcom that ran from 1981 to 1982
 Merlin (2018 film), an Indian Tamil film

Fictional characters

 Merlin is a Welsh wizard in Arthurian legend.

 Merlin (DC Comics), a half-demon sorcerer
 Merlin (Marvel Comics), the name of several characters
 Merlin the Magician (comics), a Quality Comics character
 Myrddin Wyllt, also known as Merlin Sylvestris, a figure in medieval Welsh legend

Video gaming
 Merlin (console), a handheld electronic game by Parker Brothers
 Merlin (video game), a 2000 Game Boy Color game by RFX Interactive

Literature
 Merlin, a pen name used by poet Alfred, Lord Tennyson (1809–1892)
 Merlin (literary magazine), published in Paris between 1952 and 1954
 Merlin (poem), by Robert de Boron
 Merlin (Robinson), a dramatic narrative poem by Edwin Arlington Robinson
 Merlin, a novel by Robert Nye
 Mary Stewart's Merlin Trilogy, a novel series

Music
 Merlin (Albéniz), English-language opera by Isaac Albéniz
 Merlin (Goldmark), German-language opera by Karl Goldmark 1886
 Merlin (musical), a 1983 Broadway musical
 Merlin (metal band), a Russian death metal band
 Merlin, a band formed by Dino Merlin
 Merlin (rapper), a 1980s/90s UK hip hop artist
 Merlin Network, a nonprofit organization for independent music
 Merlin (Kayak album), a 1981 album by the Dutch progressive rock band Kayak
 Merlin – Bard of the Unseen (2003), a new version of side 1 of the above album
 Merlin Rhys-Jones, guitarist and lyricist on the Ian Dury and the Blockheads album Mr. Love Pants
 Merlin (Merlin album), by the band Merlin

Places
 Merlin, Ontario, Canada, a small farming community
 Merlin, California, United States, an unincorporated community
 Merlin, Oregon, United States, an unincorporated community
 Merlin diamond mine, Australia
 2598 Merlin, an asteroid

People
 Merlin (given name)
 Merlin (surname)
 Merlin, a pen name used by poet Alfred, Lord Tennyson (1809–1892)

Science and technology

Aerospace
 Rolls-Royce Merlin, a British Second World War fighter and bomber aircraft engine
 AgustaWestland AW101, Merlin, a military helicopter
 Blue Yonder Merlin, an ultralight airplane
 Hick Merlin, a British sailplane which first flew in 1936
 Merlin (rocket engine family), developed by SpaceX
 Miles Merlin, a 1930s British monoplane
 Seedwings Europe Merlin, an Austrian hang glider design
 Swearingen Merlin, a twin turboprop business aircraft
 TechProAviation Merlin 100, Czech homebuilt aircraft design

Biology
 Merlin (bird), a species of falcon
 Merlin (protein), a cytoskeletal protein
 Merlin Bird ID, a mobile app for bird identification

Computing and telecommunications
 Merlin (assembler), a popular assembler for the Apple II family and Commodore 64/128
 Merlin (database), a database run by the Metropolitan Police Service
 Merlin M4000, a personal computer sold by British Telecom in the 1980s
 Merlin, a first-generation computer developed in 1956 by Brookhaven National Laboratory
 OS/2 Warp, version 4 (previously codenamed "Merlin"), an operating system mostly developed by IBM
 Merlin, the Office Assistant from Microsoft Office
 Merlin, the code-name of Novell's PalmDOS, a successor to DR-DOS 6.0
 AT&T Merlin, a telephone system
 IBM "Merlin" hard disk drives, see

Other
 MERLIN, an array of radio telescopes
 Merlin, a brand of garage door openers, part of the Chamberlain Group
 MERLIN reactor, a nuclear reactor in the United Kingdom
 MERLIN (refrigerator), a storage freezer on the International Space Station

Business
 Merlin Airways, an airline based in the United States
 Merlin (bicycle company), a manufacturer specializing in custom models
 Merlin Entertainments, an operator of amusement parks and other attractions
 Merlin Express, a cargo airline based in Puerto Rico
 Merlin Publishing, produced soccer trading cards and stickers in the 1990s before being taken over by Topps in 1995
 Project Merlin, an agreement between the British Government and the four major high street banks in the United Kingdom covering aspects of banking activity
 The Monmouthshire Merlin, a 19th-century Welsh newspaper – see Monmouthshire Beacon

Royal Navy
 , the name of several Royal Navy ships
 Merlin-class sloop, a class of Royal Navy wooden sloops built between 1743 and 1746

Other
 Medical Emergency Relief International, a charity
 Operation Merlin, an alleged CIA covert operation in 2000 to thwart Iran's nuclear ambitions
 Crailsheim Merlins, a German professional basketball team
 AEC Merlin, type of single-deck bus used in London between 1966 and 1981

See also
 Merlyn (disambiguation)
 Marlin